Yūgumo  was the lead ship of her class of destroyer built for the Imperial Japanese Navy during World War II.

Design and description
The Yūgumo class was a repeat of the preceding  with minor improvements that increased their anti-aircraft capabilities. Their crew numbered 228 officers and enlisted men. The ships had two Kampon geared steam turbines, each driving one propeller shaft, using steam provided by three Kampon water-tube boilers.

The main armament of the Yūgumo class consisted of six Type 3  guns in three twin-gun turrets, one superfiring pair aft and one turret forward of the superstructure. The guns were able to elevate up to 75° to increase their ability against aircraft, but their slow rate of fire, slow traversing speed, and the lack of any sort of high-angle fire-control system meant that they were virtually useless as anti-aircraft guns. They were built with four Type 96  anti-aircraft guns in two twin-gun mounts, but more of these guns were added over the course of the war. The ships were also armed with eight  torpedo tubes in a two quadruple traversing mounts; one reload was carried for each tube. Their anti-submarine weapons comprised two depth charge throwers for which 36 depth charges were carried.

Construction and career
Yūgumo participated in the battles of Midway, the Eastern Solomons, and the Santa Cruz Islands. The destroyer made troop transport runs to Guadalcanal on 7 and 10 November 1942. She then made troop transport runs to Buna, Papua New Guinea on 17 and 22 November. The ship then performed troop evacuation runs to Guadalcanal on 1 and 4 February 1943. Three days later, Yūgumo took part in a troop evacuation run to the Russell Islands. The destroyer made troop transport runs to Kolombangara on 1 and 5 April.

On 29 July, Yūgumo evacuated 479 soldiers from Kiska. She performed a troop evacuation run to Kolombangara on 2 October 1943. On the night of 6–7 October 1943, Yūgumo was on a troop evacuation run to Vella Lavella. In the Battle of Vella Lavella, she charged U.S. destroyers, irreparably damaging  with a torpedo. U.S. PT boats rescued 78 survivors and another 25 reached friendly lines in an abandoned U.S. lifeboat, but Commander Osako was killed in action.

Notes

References

External links
  CombinedFleet.com: Yūgumo-class destroyers
  CombinedFleet.com: Yūgumo history

Yūgumo-class destroyers
Ships built by Maizuru Naval Arsenal
1941 ships
World War II destroyers of Japan
World War II shipwrecks in the Pacific Ocean
Maritime incidents in October 1943